The 2013–14 Austin Peay Governors basketball team represented Austin Peay State University during the 2013–14 NCAA Division I men's basketball season. The Governors, led by 24th year head coach Dave Loos, played their home games at the Dunn Center and were members of the West Division of the Ohio Valley Conference. They finished the season 12–18, 6–10 in OVC play to finish in fifth place in the West Division. They failed to qualify for the Ohio Valley Tournament.

Roster

Schedule

|-
!colspan=9 style="background:#A40936; color:#F9F4EA;"| Exhibition

|-
!colspan=9 style="background:#A40936; color:#F9F4EA;"| Regular Season

Peay Nation Sports Television Network (PNSTVN) airs across the state on Charter Channel 99, CDE Lightband Channel 9, and U-Verse 99.

References

Austin Peay Governors men's basketball seasons
Austin Peay
Austin Peay
Austin Peay